is a Japanese footballer currently playing as a midfielder for Fagiano Okayama. He is currently on loan to Suzuka Point Getters of the Japan Football League

Career statistics

Club
.

Notes

References

External links

1996 births
Living people
Japanese footballers
Association football midfielders
J2 League players
Yokohama FC players
Fagiano Okayama players